Jean Fontenay (23 July 1911 – 21 May 1975) was a French professional road bicycle racer between 1934 and 1939, and after World War II in 1947. In his career, he won three races, but he is remembered for wearing the yellow jersey in the 1939 Tour de France for two days.

Palmarès 
1935
Winner 2nd stage Tour de l'Ouest
1936
Paris–Nice:
Winner stage 5
2nd place overall
1938
Winner Manche-Ocean

External links 

French male cyclists
1911 births
1975 deaths
Sportspeople from Ille-et-Vilaine
Cyclists from Brittany